Lukáš Nový (born 17 December 1990) is a Czech footballer who plays as a right-back for SV Neukirchen.

References

External links
 

1990 births
Living people
Czech footballers
Czech expatriate footballers
Association football defenders
FC Viktoria Plzeň players
TSG Neustrelitz players
Berliner FC Dynamo players
1. FC Magdeburg players
VfB Auerbach players
FC Rot-Weiß Erfurt players
3. Liga players
Sportspeople from Plzeň
Czech expatriate sportspeople in Germany
Expatriate footballers in Germany